West Carroll High School, or WCHS, is a public four-year high school in Savanna, Carroll County, Illinois. WCHS serves Savanna, Mt. Carroll, Thomson and the surrounding area. The campus is located 20 miles north of Clinton, Iowa. West Carroll High School was formed in 2005 from the consolidation of Mount Carroll High School, Savanna High School, and Thomson High School.

Extracurricular activities

Athletics
West Carroll High School competes in the Northwest Upstate Illini Conference and is a member school in the Illinois High School Association. Its mascot is the Thunder, with school colors of black, white, and forest green.

Predecessor high school, Savanna High School, won six state championships in boys' wrestling (1973–1974 A, 1974–1975 A, 1976–1977 A, 1978–1979 A, 1979–1980 A, and 1981–1982 A), making the school the third most successful boys' wrestling program in Illinois high school history in terms of championships.

Two years before the opening of West Carroll, Savanna and Mount Carroll began a cooperative sharing program for several sports, including football. Prior to the cooperative, Savanna amassed a 63-game losing streak in football, dating to October 1995; the streak was once the subject of a Sports Illustrated story by columnist Rick Reilly.
 The West Carroll cooperative football won its first game in 2003 and earned playoff berths in 2005, 2006 and 2007.

During the 2016-2017 year, three wrestlers won their way to the state matches in 1A.  Nate Schultz won 3rd in state at 182 lbs, Andrew VanKampen won 5th in state at 120 lbs, Josh Anderson won 5th in state at 285 lbs.

During the 2017-2018 season, the football team lost in the 2nd round of the playoffs to GCMS, who became the 2A state champions.  The team earned a final ranking of 7th in state for 2A IHSA by MaxPreps.  Senior, linebacker, Devon Murray was also voted to 1st Team All-State as a linebacker and Kaleb Plattenberger was chosen to play in the Shrine All-State football game.

Music
The school has won five state championships in music: 2009–2010, 2010–2011, 2011–2012, 2012-2013, and 2016-2017 (Class B).

West Carroll High School's music department has secured a music sweepstakes trophy (1st-3rd) every year the high school has existed (2005 – present). Since the 2005–2006 academic year, an IHSA music sweepstakes trophy requires a school to finish in the top 10 of its respective class.

References

External links
 West Carroll High School
 West Carroll Community Unit School District 314

Public high schools in Illinois
Schools in Carroll County, Illinois